Golofeyevka is a rural locality (a selo) and the administrative center of Golofeyevskoye Rural Settlement, Volokonovsky District, Belgorod Oblast, Russia. The population was 342 as of 2010. There are 4 streets.

Geography 
Golofeyevka is located 21 km southeast of Volokonovka (the district's administrative centre) by road. Vladimirovka is the nearest rural locality.

References 

Rural localities in Volokonovsky District